Dorstenia tuberosa is a plant species in the family Moraceae which is native to Cuba.

References

tuberosa
Plants described in 1860
Flora of Cuba
Flora without expected TNC conservation status